Grand-Pré may refer to:
 Carlos de Grand Pré, governor of the West Florida in 1805 and of the Natchez District
 Grand-Pré National Historic Site, a park set aside to commemorate the Grand-Pré area of Nova Scotia as a centre of Acadian settlement from 1682 to 1755
 Grand-Pré, Nova Scotia, a Canadian rural community in Kings County, Nova Scotia
 Grandpré, Ardennes, France
 Raid on Grand Pré, the major action of a raiding expedition conducted by New England militia Colonel Benjamin Church against French Acadia in June 1704, during Queen Anne's War
 Battle of Grand Pré, also known as the Battle of Minas, a battle in King George's War in the winter of 1747 during the War of the Austrian Succession
 Siege of Grand Pre, a 1749 conflict during Father Le Loutre's War between the British and the Wabanaki Confederacy and Acadians

See also 
 Grandpré (disambiguation)